Dove 103.7-FM is a religious radio station in Freeport, Bahamas.

References

External links 
 
  (Official Facebook page)

Radio stations in the Bahamas
Christian radio stations in North America